Social Democratic Party is a political party in Sri Lanka. The party was launched by Rohan Pallewatta, a businessman who intends to contest the 2019 Presidential election

Social Democratic Party was established as a result of discussions that took place among like-minded professionals of the society, who are concerned about the distancing of Sri Lankan's dream for a stable country and better tomorrow.

Notes

References

External links
  Social Democratic Party of Sri Lanka (Official Website)

Political parties in Sri Lanka
Political parties established in 2017
2017 establishments in Sri Lanka